City Park (German: Stadtpark) is a 1951 Austrian comedy drama film directed by Hubert Marischka and starring Annie Rosar, Peter Czejke and Erik Frey.

The film's art direction was by Otto Pischinger. It was shot at the Sievering Studios in Vienna and on location around the city.

Cast
 Annie Rosar as Anna Wawruschka
 Peter Czejke as Peter 
 Erik Frey as Herbert Berger
 Friedl Loor as Alice Berger
 Fritz Imhoff as Lorenz Hofstetter
 Rudolf Carl as Gruber Würstelmann
 Ida Krottendorf as Franziska Berger
 Franz Marischka as Rudolf
 Hilde Sochor
 Hugo Gottschlich 
 Auguste Pünkösdy 
 Otto Treßler 
 Karl Ehmann 
 Carl Bosse 
 Traute Servi 
 Heinz Conrads 
 Erich Dörner
 Karl Kalwoda 
 Franz Schier

References

Bibliography 
 Fritsche, Maria. Homemade Men in Postwar Austrian Cinema: Nationhood, Genre and Masculinity. Berghahn Books, 2013.

External links 
 

1951 films
1951 comedy-drama films
Austrian comedy-drama films
1950s German-language films
Films directed by Hubert Marischka
Austrian black-and-white films
Films shot at Sievering Studios
Films shot in Vienna